The 2012 San Diego mayoral election was held on Tuesday, November 6, 2012, to elect the mayor for San Diego. Incumbent mayor Jerry Sanders was term-limited and ineligible to run for re-election.

Municipal elections in California are officially non-partisan, though some candidates do receive funding and support from various political parties. The non-partisan primary was held Tuesday, June 5, 2012. As no candidate received a majority of primary votes to be declared elected outright, the top two finishers, San Diego City Councilman Carl DeMaio and Congressman Bob Filner, advanced to the November general election. Filner was elected mayor with a majority of the votes in the November election.

The top two candidates received official support from their respective parties in the primaries and the general election; DeMaio was endorsed by the California Republican Party and Filner was endorsed by the California Democratic Party.

Candidates

Declared
 Carl DeMaio, member of the San Diego City Council (Voter registration: Republican)
 Bonnie Dumanis, District Attorney of San Diego County (Voter registration: Republican)
 Bob Filner, U. S. Representative (Voter registration: Democratic)
 Nathan Fletcher, state Assemblyman (Voter registration: Republican (until March 2012), Independent (after March 2012))
 Tobiah Pettus, businessman (Voter registration: Republican)

Declined
 Kevin Faulconer, member of the San Diego City Council (Voter registration: Republican)
 Steve Francis, businessman and mayoral candidate in 2005 and 2008 (Voter registration: Republican)
 Christine Kehoe, state Senator (Voter registration: Democratic)

Campaign
The mayoral race received national attention in March 2012 when The New York Times columnist David Brooks penned a column praising the moderate Nathan Fletcher and decrying the San Diego GOP's decision to back "orthodox conservative" Carl DeMaio over Fletcher for the post. Brooks was criticized by Reason's Matt Welch, who pointed out that DeMaio is openly gay and described him as having libertarian leanings. A few weeks after the local Republican party endorsed DeMaio, Fletcher announced he was leaving the Republican party and becoming an independent.

In the primary election held June 5, DeMaio placed first with 31.4 percent of the vote, followed by Filner with 30.5 percent. Trailing were Fletcher with 24.1 percent and Dumanis with 13.3 percent. As the top two vote-getters, DeMaio and Filner advanced to the November ballot. Filner was then elected mayor with 52.5 percent of the votes in the November election.

Primary election

Polling

Results

General election

Polling

Results

References

2012 California elections
2012 United States mayoral elections
2012
2012